The large moth subfamily Lymantriinae contains the following genera beginning with S:

References 

Lymantriinae
Lymantriid genera S